The men's team time trial cycling event at the 1984 Summer Olympics took place on 5 August and was one of eight cycling events at the 1984 Olympics. The qualification and quarter finals were on 2 August and the semi finals and finals on 3 August.

The Italian team recorded a dominant victory by winning by 4:10 over Switzerland. The Italian team was one of the first teams to use modern carbon-fiber disc wheels, which are now commonly used in time trials. Their time of 1h 58:28 was the fastest time ever recorded over 100 km in a team time trial, and would have been faster without a flat tire that cost them 20 seconds to change the wheel. The venue was a 15½-mile stretch of the Artesia Freeway.

Results

References

Cycling at the 1984 Summer Olympics
Cycling at the Summer Olympics – Men's team time trial
Road cycling at the 1984 Summer Olympics
Men's events at the 1984 Summer Olympics